Nude & Natural: The Magazine of Naturist Living or simply N magazine, is a quarterly 100+ page naturist magazine published by The Naturist Society Foundation in Oshkosh, Wisconsin and distributed throughout the United States and internationally. In addition to the current news the magazine also features scholarly articles on naturist history, culture and current legal issues.

Although it has a small paid staff, many articles and photos are contributed by TNSF members.  The editors eschew the use of posed "glamor" photography; rather it publishes photos of naturists of all ages and physical condition simply enjoying nude recreation. Since the Spring of 2005 the magazine has been printed in full color; in 2008 TNS began using recycled paper.

Membership in The Naturist Society Foundation includes a subscription to N magazine.

History
The Naturist Society, founded by Lee Baxandall, began in the 1970s as the "Free Beaches Documentation Center" with a quarterly newspaper, the Sun. The magazine began in 1980 as Clothed with the Sun. In 1989 the magazine changed its name to Nude & Natural (N) The Magazine of Naturist Living. Starting with Issue 24.3, Spring 2005, the magazine began running in color.

Contributors
 Lee Baxandall
 Judi Ditzler, Editor (1999–2005)
 Nicky Hoffman Lee Editor 2006 -
 Bob Morton
 Mark Storey, Editor-at-large

In the media
The Oshkosh Northwestern, Lee Baxandall Obituary -  Thursday December 4, 2008 cites Clothed with the Sun, Nude & Natural and N magazine.
N magazine appeared in the episode "Mr. Monk and the Naked Man" of Monk -  season 6, episode 3, air date July 27, 2007) along with Naturist Society banner, logo and other paraphernalia.

See also

 Nudity

External links
 website and alternate site

1980 establishments in Wisconsin
Alternative magazines
Lifestyle magazines published in the United States
Monthly magazines published in the United States
Magazines established in 1980
Magazines published in Wisconsin
Naturist magazines